Yeh Rishtey Hain Pyaar Ke, popularly known as YRHPK is an Indian Hindi-language romantic drama television series that premiered on 18 March 2019 on Star Plus. It is digitally available on Disney+ Hotstar. Produced by Rajan Shahi under the banner of Director's Kut Productions, it is a spin-off of Star Plus's Yeh Rishta Kya Kehlata Hai. It starred Rhea Sharma and Shaheer Sheikh. It went off-air on 17 October 2020.

Premise
Mishti, a young woman, is asked to get married to the person of her family's choice. However, she feels that she must get a chance to know her life partner well before making the commitment.

Plot

Cast

Main 
 Rhea Sharma as Mishti Agrawal Rajvansh: Karishma and Naman's daughter; Rajshree and Vishambhar's adopted daughter; Devyani's granddaughter; Abir's wife; Amish's mother (2019–2020)
 Aarna Sharma as Young Mishti Agrawal (2019)
 Shaheer Sheikh as Abir Rajvansh: Meenakshi and Mehul's son; Kunal's half-brother; Mishti's husband; Amish's father (2019–2020)
 Runav Shah as Young Abir Rajvansh (2019)

Recurring 
Ritvik Arora / Avinash Mishra as Kunal Rajvansh: Parul and Mehul's son; Meenakshi's step-son; Abir's half-brother; Kuhu's husband; Amish's uncle (2019–2020) / (2020)
 Kaveri Priyam as Kuhu Maheshwari Rajvansh: Shaurya and Sneha's daughter; Varsha's step-daughter; Ananya's half-sister; Kunal's wife, Amish's surrogate mother and aunt (2019–2020)
Rupal Patel as Meenakshi Rajvansh: Lajvanti and Yashpal's daughter; Kaushal's sister; Mehul's wife; Abir's mother; Kunal's step-mother; Amish's grandmother (2019–2020)
 Sameer Dharmadhikari as Mehul Kapadia: Meenakshi and Parul's husband; Abir and Kunal's father; Amish's grandfather (2019)
 Chaitrali Gupte as Parul: Mehul's second wife; Kunal's mother; Rajvansh family's house help (2019–2020)
 Devaj Bhanushali as Baby Amish Rajvansh: Mishti and Abir's son (2020)
 Deepak Gheewala as Yashpal Rajvansh: Lajwanti's husband; Meenakshi and Kaushal's father; Abir's grandfather (2019–2020)
 Sangeeta Kapure as Nidhi Rajvansh: Kaushal's wife; Atul and Ketki's mother (2019–2020)
 Sanjeev Jotangia as Kaushal Rajvansh: Lajvanti and Yashpal's son; Meenakshi's brother; Nidhi's husband; Atul and Ketki's father (2019–2020)
 Shashwat Tripathi as Atul Rajvansh: Nidhi and Kaushal's son; Ketki's brother; Abir and Kunal's cousin (2019)
 Trishaa Chatterjee as Ketki "Ketu" Rajvansh: Nidhi and Kaushal's daughter; Atul's sister; Abir and Kunal's cousin (2019–2020)
 Sanjeev Seth as Vishambharnath Maheshwari: Bhairavi's son; Omkarnath's brother; Rajshree's husband; Shaurya and Akshara's father; Mishti's foster father; Ananya,Naksh,Naira and Kuhu's grandfather;Krish,Kairav and Akshara Goenka's great-grandfather;Abhir's great-great grandfather (2019–2020)
 Lata Sabharwal as Rajshree Maheshwari: Ratan's sister; Vishambharnath's wife; Shaurya and Akshara's mother; Mishti's foster mother; Ananya,Naksh,Naira and Kuhu's grandmother;Krish,Kairav and Akshara Goenka's great-grandmother;Abhir's great-great grandmother (2019–2020)
 Samir Sharma as Shaurya Maheshwari: Rajshree and Vishambharnath's son; Akshara's brother; Varsha's husband; Ananya and Kuhu's father (2019–2020)
 Pooja Joshi Arora as Varsha Maheshwari: Sulekha's daughter; Shaurya's wife; Ananya's mother; Kuhu's step-mother (2019–2020)
 Soniya Kaur as Jasmeet Kaur Maheshwari: Pammi and Sethi's daughter; Anshuman's wife; Nishant's mother (2019–2020)
 Jay Pathak as Naman Agrawal: Devyani and Suresh's son; Muskaan's brother; Karishma's former husband; Mishti's father;Amish's grandfather (2019)
 Kshitee Jog as Devyani Singhania: Naman and Muskaan's mother; Suresh's former wife; Rajshekhar's wife; Mishti's grandmother;Amish's great grandmother (2019–2020)
 Akshaya Naik as Ananya Maheshwari Sharma: Varsha and Shaurya's daughter; Kuhu's half-sister; Ranveer's wife (2019)
 Vatsal Sheth as Nishant "Nannu" Maheshwari: Anshuman and Jasmeet's son; Ananya and Kuhu's cousin; Mishti's former fiancée (2019–2020)
 Mohit Sharma as Jugnu: Rajvansh family's house help; Abir's friend (2019–2020)
 Amardeep Jha as Shankari: Maheshwari family's match-maker (2019)
 Palak Purswani as Shweta: Kunal's former fiancée (2019)
 Ruslaan Mumtaz as Varun Soni: Nirmala and Kalpesh's son; Karan's brother; Ketki's former fiancé (2020)
 Seema Pandey as Nirmala Soni: Kalpesh's wife; Varun and Karan's mother (2020)
 Mandeep Kumar as Kalpesh Soni: Nirmala's husband; Varun and Karan's father (2020)
 Zubin Sethi as Karan Soni: Nirmala and Kalpesh's son; Varun's brother (2020)

Special appearances 
 Shivangi Joshi as Naira Singhania Goenka: Akshara and Naitik's daughter; Naksh's sister; Kartik's wife; Mishti's step cousin; Kuhu's cousin (2019)
 Mohsin Khan as Kartik Goenka: Soumya and Manish's son; Keerti's brother; Naira's husband (2019)
 Heli Daruwala as Heli: Abir's friend (2019)
 Helly Shah as Neha: Abir's friend (2019)
 Aaditya Bajpayee as Kabir: Neha's fiancé (2019)
 Sanjana Phadke as Lalita: Parul's sister (2019)
 Ronit Roy as SP Prithvi Singh: To promote Hostages (2019)
 Aditi Sharma as Roshni: To promote Yehh Jadu Hai Jinn Ka! (2019)
 Vikram Singh Chauhan as Aman Khan: To promote Yehh Jadu Hai Jinn Ka! (2019)

Production

Development 
In June 2018, there were reports of Yeh Rishta Kya Kehlata Hai getting a spin-off. However, producer Rajan Shahi denied it. But, the plan for a spin-off was announced in January 2019. Talking about it producer Rajan Shahi said, "We are working on a spin-off of Yeh Rishta Kya Kehlata Hai, which completed 10 years recently. Sheikh has been signed on to play the male lead. He will be seen in a dynamic role, which will be different from his previous outings. I realised that some characters from the original show deserve to be explored further."

The team had a havan on their sets on February 21, 2019, for an auspicious beginning to their new journey.

In February 2019, Shivangi Joshi introduced Rhea Sharma as Mishti. Soon, in March 2019, a promo based on marriage and courtship featuring Rhea Sharma, Lata Sabharwal, Sanjeev Seth, Pooja Joshi Arora, Kshitee Jog and Medha Jambodhkar was released. Later, rapper and singer Badshah with some female characters of other shows of Star Plus promoted the show along with Rhea Sharma. The next promo featured Shaheer Sheikh and Rhea Sharma with the song sung by Badshah. Days before its premiere, another promo featuring both on a roof of a bus was released.

Casting 

Rhea Sharma was selected to portray Mishti and Shaheer Sheikh to portray Abir. Shaheer Sheikh expressed 

Rhea Sharma stated that she can relate her character to Deepika Padukone’s character Naina from the film Yeh Jawaani Hai Deewani. Talking about the show, Rhea Sharma said, 

Lata Sabharwal, Sanjeev Seth, Pooja Joshi Arora, Akshaya Naik, Amardeep Jha, Kshitee Jog, Shivangi Joshi and Mohsin Khan reprise their respective roles from the parent series Yeh Rishta Kya Kehlata Hai as Rajshri, Vishambharnath, Varsha, Ananya, Shankari, Devyaani, Naira and Kartik respectively. Jay Pathak, Samir Sharma and Soniya Kaur were cast as Naman, Shaurya and Jasmeet which were earlier played by Anshul Pandey, Yash Gera and Shirin Sewani in Yeh Rishta Kya Kehlata Hai.

Besides Kaveri Priyam, Ritvik Arora, Rupal Patel, Deepak Gheewala, Sangeeta Kapure, Sanjeev Jotangia, Chaitrali Gupte, Trishaa Chatterjee and Shashwat Tripati were cast.

Rupal Patel related her role Meenakshi Rajvansh and her previous well known role Kokila Modi in Saath Nibhana Saathiya as twins stating, "I would say that Kokila and Meenakshi are like twins. While Kokila was traditional and orthodox, Meenakshi is sophisticated and educated. However, both want the best for their families and feel that they are always right. I was completely bowled over by the character of Meenakshi and the way it has been written, when Rajan Sir offered me the role. It has a lot of depth. I had to prep for the part."

Earlier, Harshad Arora was in talks for playing Abir while Tushar Khanna was supposed to play Kunal. But Shaheer Sheikh and Ritvik Arora replaced them.

Palak Purswani was cast to play Kunal's former girlfriend Shweta in July 2019. Sameer Dharmadhikari was roped to play Abir's father, Mehul in September 2019.  In November 2019, Helly Shah was roped for a cameo as Neha. Vatsal Sheth entered soon after as Nishant Maheshwari and quit on 5 February 2020 with the end of his role. When the filming resumed after three months in late June after indefinite halt owing COVID-19 outbreak, Ruslaan Mumtaz and Seema Pandey were cast. In the last week of July 2020, Producer Rajan Shahi confirmed replacing Arora after discussions stalled between the actor and studio during the COVID-19 outbreak. Avinash Mishra was brought in to replace Arora. The character Shaurya played by Samir Sharma was not seen in the series post-shoot resuming with his death in August 2020.

Filming 
Based on the backdrop of Gujarat, set in Rajkot, the series is mainly filmed at the sets created in Film City at Mumbai. Some of the initial sequences were shot at Bhuj, Gujarat.

The show is set in Rajkot, Gujarat. The team had shot some initial scenes in Bhuj and Kutch of Gujarat. Stating about it Rajan Shahi says, “We wanted to extend the show beyond Rajasthan and decided to add the vibrancy of Gujarat. My entire creative team explored the region, including various markets of Kutch, to capture the region flawlessly in our show. We have included various artworks, handicrafts, handlooms and the aesthetics of Kutch. Just like Kartik and Naira, I am looking at creating Abir and Mishti as the next sought after couple on Hindi television!”

Release 
A promo was released, featuring the lead, Rhea Sharma and the female members of Singhania, Maheshwari and Goenka families with Badshah. The promo has a rap sung by Badshah. A peppy song was released wherein, Shaheer quizzes Rhea on how someone can marry by just knowing them over a cup of tea.

Broadcast 
The production and airing of the show was halted indefinitely in late March 2020 due to the COVID-19 outbreak in India. Because of the outbreak, the filming of television series and films was halted on 19 March 2020 and expected to resume on 1 April 2020 which was not feasible and the series was last broadcast on 25 March 2020 when the remaining episodes were aired. The production and filming of the series resumed after three months on 26 June 2020. The airing of the series resumed from 13 July 2020, being switched from its earlier 10:00 pm (IST) slot to 9:00pm (IST) slot and the 10:00 pm (IST) slot was given to new show Anupamaa of the same production house(which was earlier planned at 9:00PM slot).

Cancellation 
On 18 September 2020, the series' cancellation was confirmed after the ratings dropped drastically, exiting the top 20 Hindi GECs, when the series was shifted to 9:00 pm (IST) from its earlier 10:00 pm (IST) slot post-COVID-19 break. The shooting of the series was completed on 10 October 2020 and the series aired its last episode on 17 October 2020, before being replaced by Saath Nibhaana Saathiya 2.

Shaheer Sheikh thanked Rhea Sharma for being the Mishti to his Abir. He said, "Bringing a love story to life means having someone who understands and feeds off your energy. You made ‘Abir’ come to life, by being ‘Mishti’.. together we tried to create something fun, meaningful & hopeful. The world looked at Ajib Rajvansh through ur eyes."

With the show going off-air Rhea Sharma said "I will miss playing Mishti a lot, she was and will always be close to my heart."

The shows fans protested to the show going off-air. There was widespread anger. In September 2020, one of its fan attempted suicide after knowing that the show will end soon.

Crossover
Yeh Rishta Kya Kehlata Hai and Yeh Rishtey Hain Pyaar Ke had an integration from 12 March 2019 to 16 March 2019. Rhea Sharma as Mishti and Kaveri Priyam as Kuhu were introduced during the integration.

Reception

Critical reception
Yeh Rishtey Hain Pyaar Ke generally received positive reviews from the critics.

The Times Of India appreciated the chemistry of the leads Rhea Sharma and Shaheer Sheikh and also acclaimed the series as the best Hindi fiction launch of 2019.

India Today stated, "The authentic flavour of Gujarat, the dialect, costumes to fresh look of the characters - telly buffs are rejoicing and relishing the spin-off series."

Pinkvilla stated "The makers have managed to strike a balance between the young and the old. Shaheer Sheikh and Rhea Sharma's show lets love brew in a carefully woven drama."

Ratings

UK
On 21 March 2019, it became the second most watched show with 61.4 K viewers. The show became the most watched show with 76.9 K viewers on 9 December 2019. On 19 December 2019, it was Utsav Plus's third most watched show with 35.9 K viewers.

On 15 January 2020, it had 33.4 K viewers and was Utsav Plus's fifth most watched show. On 17 August 2020, it had 36.9 K viewers and was one of the most watched show.

In its last week, on 14 October 2020, it was the third most watched show with 69.2 K viewers. On 17 October 2020, its final episode had 16.4 K viewers, being fifth most watched show.

Controversies

Shaheer Sheikh's poetry issue
Shaheer recently got himself embroiled in a controversy wherein he was accused for claiming of writing a poetry for his show. The original writer of it called out to him after this action, and the actor released a statement apologizing for the same.

Ritvik Arora's  controversial exit
Ritvik Arora quit the show in July 2020. On Ritvik being out of the show, Rajan Shah claimed Ritvik Arora has been unprofessional in his conduct. He said:

Ritvik on his part said,

Soundtrack

Yeh Rishtey Hain Pyaar Ke's soundtrack is composed by Nakash Aziz and Sargam Jassu. The title track "Yeh Rishtey Hain Pyaar Ke", is an original track and is the theme song of the show. It received positive reviews.

The tracks "Dheere Dheere Se" and "Saathiya Mere" were the theme songs of Abir and Mishti. The tracks have received positive reviews. "Bekhudi" is the theme song of Kunal and Kuhu. Female version of Bekhudi and "Jeete Hain Chal" has been sung by Pamela Jain.

Other tracks of the album includes, "Nahi Lagta Dil Mera", wedding songs "Rishta Aya Hai" and "Shaadi Hai Ghar Mein" and the Holi Special song "Holi Hai".

Awards and nominations

See also
 List of programs broadcast by Star Plus

References

External links
Yeh Rishtey Hain Pyaar Ke on IMDb
Yeh Rishtey Hain Pyaar Ke on Hotstar

2019 Indian television series debuts
2020 Indian television series endings
StarPlus original programming
Television shows set in Gujarat
Hindi-language television shows
Indian television soap operas
Indian television spin-offs